Jan Zaleski (born 8 March 1869 in Kalwaria near Augustów (modern-day Lithuania), in the Kingdom of Poland; died 22 August 1932 in Warsaw, Republic of Poland) was a Polish biochemist who made significant contributions to the understanding of blood chemistry.

Career 
From 1904–1907, Zaleski was a lecturer at the Agrarian University of Dublany, near Lviv. From 1907–1918, Zaleski worked at the Medical Institute for Women in Petrograd, starting out as a laboratory assistant and becoming Professor of General and Organic Chemistry in 1916. From 1922 until his death in 1932, Zaleski was Professor of Pharmaceutical Chemistry and Toxicology at Warsaw University. He became a member of the Polish Academy of Learning in 1921.

Research 
Between 1895 and 1901, Zaleski conducted research with Marceli Nencki on the ammonia content of blood and on conversions of blood pigments. In 1907, Zaleski published an empirical formula of mesoporphyrin. In 1924, he co-authored with Kazimierz Lindenfeld a method to obtain hemin.

References

External links

Polish biochemists
Polish chemists
1869 births
1932 deaths